Cú Chonnacht Ó Fialáin was a Gaelic Irish poet.

Ó Fialáin was a member of a family associated with Boho, County Fermanagh (see Bhotha Mhuintir Uí Fhialáin). John Ó Fialáin is stated in the Annals of Ulster as being the professor in poetry for the sons of Phillip Mág Uidhir upon his death in 1483.

Cú Chonnacht is primarily known for his poem,  ("An ollam is entitled to practice his craft"), a petition to his patron, Tomás Óg Mág Uidhir, king of Fermanagh, who reigned 1430-1471 (dying in 1480). This poem was later included in the important Irish literary compilation of 1631, the Book of O'Conor Donn ('donn' or 'dhoinn' to distinguish the brown O'Conor family from the O'Conor Roe, the 'red' clan), collected on the Continent, at Ostend.

References

Further reading
 A Bardic Miscellany: Five Hundred Bardic poems from manuscripts in Irish and British libraries, edited by Damian McManus and Eoghan Ó Raghallaigh, Trinity Irish Studies, Dublin, 2010.

External links
 http://www.irishtimes.com/ancestor/surname/index.cfm?fuseaction=Go.&UserID=

15th-century births
15th-century deaths
Medieval Irish poets
People from County Fermanagh
15th-century Irish poets
Irish male poets
Irish-language writers